Andranik Khachatryan (born 1956) is a retired Soviet professional football player.

1956 births
Living people
Armenian footballers
Soviet footballers
FC Ararat Yerevan players
Soviet Top League players
Soviet Armenians

Association football forwards
Association football defenders